Night Accident is a 1980 Soviet crime film directed by Venyamin Dorman.

Plot 
A resident of Magadan Ukladova was robbed. She claims that the taxi driver did it. The investigator found a taxi driver. As it turned out, he was already in prison for hooliganism. All facts point to him, but he refuses to admit his guilt.

Cast 
 Pyotr Velyaminov as Mitin
 Galina Polskikh as Galina Ukladova
 Aleksey Zharkov as Stepan Voronov
 Yuriy Kayurov as Vladykin
 Boris Smorchkov as Babin
 Valentina Grushina as Sirotina
 Natalya Nazarova as Simukova
 Tatyana Pelttser as Aleksandra Alekseyevna
 Yury Volyntsev as Astakhov (as Yuri Volyntsev)
 Darya Mikhaylova

References

External links 
 

1980 crime films
1980 films
1980s Russian-language films
Soviet crime films